Dumitru Sulică (16 April 1921 – 1987) was a Romanian alpine skier. He competed at the 1948 Winter Olympics and the 1952 Winter Olympics.

References

1921 births
1987 deaths
Romanian male alpine skiers
Olympic alpine skiers of Romania
Alpine skiers at the 1948 Winter Olympics
Alpine skiers at the 1952 Winter Olympics
Sportspeople from Brașov